Wahoo Public Schools is a school district headquartered in Wahoo, Nebraska.

 Brandon Lavaley is the superintendent. The district has three schools: Wahoo Elementary School, Wahoo Middle School, and Wahoo High School.

References

External links
 Wahoo Public Schools
School districts in Nebraska
Education in Saunders County, Nebraska